National Highway 136B, commonly referred to as NH 136B is a national highway in India. It is a secondary route of National Highway 36.  NH-136B runs in the state of Tamil Nadu in India.

Route 
NH136B connects Kumbakonam and Sirkazhi in the state of Tamil Nadu.

Junctions  

  Terminal near Kumbakonam.
  Terminal near Sirkazhi.

See also 
 List of National Highways in India
 List of National Highways in India by state

References

External links 

 NH 136B on OpenStreetMap

National highways in India
National Highways in Tamil Nadu